The 1926 AAA Championship Car season consisted of 24 races, beginning in Miami Beach, Florida on February 22 and concluding in Pineville, North Carolina on November 11.  There were also 7 non-championship races.  The AAA National Champion was Harry Hartz and the Indianapolis 500 winner was Frank Lockhart.

Schedule and results
All races running on Dirt/Brick/Board Oval.

Indianapolis 500 was AAA-sanctioned and counted towards the 1926 AIACR World Manufacturers' Championship title.

 Scheduled for 500 miles, stopped due to rain.

Leading National Championship standings

References

See also
 1926 Indianapolis 500

AAA Championship Car season
AAA Championship Car
1926 in American motorsport